Deolinda Mulói Gimo (born August 15, 1987), is a Mozambican basketball player. She is 190 cm (6'2") tall and plays as a Power Forward/Center.

External links
 FIBA.com Profile
 AfricaBasket Profile
 Scoresway Profile
 Facebook Profile

References

1987 births
Living people
Sportspeople from Maputo
Mozambican women's basketball players
C.D. Primeiro de Agosto women's basketball players
Centers (basketball)
Basketball players at the 2018 Commonwealth Games
Commonwealth Games competitors for Mozambique